Thomas Preining (born 21 July 1998) is an Austrian racing driver who is the 2018 German Porsche Carrera Cup champion.

Career

Formula 4
Preining's first season in single seaters was in 2015 with German team ADAC Berlin-Brandenburg where he competed at the first two rounds in the ADAC Formula 4 Championship where he got a podium in only his third race at this level at Oschersleben. Preining finished the season with 16 points. 
Preining competed in another F4 championship in 2015 where he raced at the first round in the Italian F4 Championship at Vallelunga with German team Mücke Motorsport. His best finish was 10th.

In 2016 he returned to the ADAC F4 grid for the full season but this time racing for Austrian team Lechner Racing. Preining would go on to finished the season with two wins and a further 4 podiums, this helped him to 4th in the championship with 180.5 points. Championship winner, Joey Mawson, finished 193.5 points ahead of Preining. 
Like with the German championship, Preining returned to race in the Italian F4 Championship in 2016. He only competed one round and his best result was 12th.

Porsche Carrera Cup Germany
In 2017 Preining made the switch from single seater to Sports car where he competed in the 2017 Porsche Carrera Cup in Germany racing for Konrad Motorsport. Preining won two races meaning he finished 5 points behind Christian Engelhart in 7th. Preining made the switch to his former team Lechner Racing for 2018 where he dominated the season, winning 10 of 14 races and only failing to finish on the podium twice. He won the championship by 37 points over Michael Ammermüller.

Formula E
Due to Preining's affiliation with Porsche, their Formula E team offered him a drive in the Rookie test at Marrakech. He partnered experienced French driver Frédéric Makowiecki. Preining's fastest time 1:19.374 which was almost 3 seconds slower than Nick Cassidy's fastest time of a 1:16.467.

Deutsche Tourenwagen Masters

In December 2021, it was confirmed that Preining would race full-time in the 2022 Deutsche Tourenwagen Masters by driving the only Porsche 911 GT3 R car fielded by KÜS Team Bernhard. In the first race of the fourth round at the Norisring, Preining scored his first win in the DTM, which was also the first win for a Porsche car in the series. His second win in the DTM came in the second race of the seventh round at the Red Bull Ring, which saw him starting from seventh position and making several overtakes on a wet track, before being able to maintain the lead as the track began to dry. Ahead of the eighth and final round at the Hockenheimring, Preining was one of the five drivers who had a chance of winning the championship title. However, he was in one of the cars that were involved in a major crash during the Saturday race. Although he was able to extract himself from his badly damaged car, the doctors eventually declared him unfit to participate in the Sunday race. This left him in 5th place in the drivers' standings, with a total of 116 points.

In 2023, Preining returned to the series for a second consecutive season, moving to fellow Porsche outfit Manthey EMA. In addition, Olsen competed in the 2023 GT World Challenge Europe Endurance Cup with Rutronik Racing, sharing a Pro class entry with Laurin Heinrich and DTM teammate Dennis Olsen.

Racing record

Career summary

† As Preining was a guest driver, he was ineligible toscore points. 

* Season still in progress.

Complete 24 Hours of Le Mans results

Complete Deutsche Tourenwagen Masters results
(key) (Races in bold indicate pole position) (Races in italics indicate fastest lap)

References

External links
 

1998 births
Living people
Austrian racing drivers
24 Hours of Le Mans drivers
ADAC Formula 4 drivers
Italian F4 Championship drivers
Porsche Supercup drivers
FIA World Endurance Championship drivers
International GT Open drivers
ADAC GT Masters drivers
European Le Mans Series drivers
Deutsche Tourenwagen Masters drivers
Porsche Motorsports drivers
Mücke Motorsport drivers
Walter Lechner Racing drivers
Nürburgring 24 Hours drivers
24H Series drivers
Porsche Carrera Cup Germany drivers